Petri Viljanen is a Finnish football referee and retired football player.

Player career 
He played four seasons in the Finnish top division Veikkausliiga and won the Finnish Cup with his side FC Haka in 2005. Viljanen was a member of the Finnish squad in the 2009 UEFA U-21 Championship.

Referee 
Viljanen made his Finnish premier division debut in June 2014 by officiating the match between FC Inter and MYPA. In July he was nominated as one of the referees of the 2014 Nordic Under-17 Football Championship in Denmark.

Sources
Guardian Football
Veikkausliiga player statistics

References

1987 births
Living people
FC Haka players
Porin Palloilijat players
Finnish football referees
Finnish footballers
Finland under-21 international footballers
Association football defenders
Sportspeople from Pori